The 1920 Summer Olympics, officially known as the Games of the VII Olympiad and commonly known as Antwerp 1920 (Dutch and German: Antwerpen 1920), were an international multi-sport event held in 1920 in Antwerp, Belgium.

In March 1912, during the 13th session of the IOC, Belgium's bid to host the 1920 Summer Olympics was made by Baron Édouard de Laveleye, president of the Belgian Olympic Committee and of the Royal Belgian Football Association. No fixed host city was proposed at the time.

The 1916 Summer Olympics, to have been held in Berlin, capital of the German Empire, were cancelled due to World War I. When the Olympic Games resumed after the war, Antwerp was awarded hosting the 1920 Summer Games as tribute to the Belgian people. The aftermath of the war and the Paris Peace Conference, 1919 affected the Olympic Games not only due to new states being created, but also by sanctions against the nations that lost the war and were blamed for starting it. Hungary, Germany, Austria, Bulgaria, and the Ottoman Empire were banned from competing in the Games. The newly formed Soviet Union chose not to attend the Games. Germany did not return to Olympic competition until 1928 and instead hosted a series of games called Deutsche Kampfspiele, starting with the Winter edition of 1922 (which predated the first Winter Olympics).

The United States won the most gold and overall medals.

The sailing events were held in Ostend, Belgium, and two in Amsterdam, Netherlands.

Host city selection
In March 1912, during the 13th session of the IOC, the bid on the behalf of Belgium to host the 1920 Summer Olympics. It was made by Baron Édouard de Laveleye, president of the Belgian Olympic Committee and of the Royal Belgian Football Association. No fixed host city was proposed at the time.

The organizing committee was created on 9 August 1913. It had four presidents:
Édouard de Laveleye, president of the Belgian Olympic Committee
Henri de Baillet-Latour, member of the IOC
Robert Osterrieth, president of the Royal Yacht Club of Belgium
Charles Cnoops, vice-president of the Belgian Fencing Association

Among the 22 vice-presidents of the committee were people with a military or industrial background, and further people from sports organizations like Paul Havenith, president of the football and athletics club K. Beerschot V.A.C. and Nicolaas Jan Cupérus, president of the Belgian Gymnastics Federation.

The first action of the committee was to send an official letter to the IOC in Paris, confirming Antwerp as the city for the Belgian Olympic bid. With Antwerp confirmed as the Olympic Games host, Belgium began reconstructing the Beerschot Stadium into the Olympisch Stadion. Construction on the new Olympic stadium began in July 1919 and finished in May 1920.

In 1914, a 109-page brochure was created to promote the idea of Antwerp as a host city for the Olympics: Aurons-nous la VIIème Olympiade à Anvers? (Will we have the 7th Olympiad at Antwerp?). It was sent to all IOC members and was used during the 6th Olympic Congress in Paris in 1914, where the candidacies of Amsterdam, Antwerp, Budapest, and Rome were discussed. Despite a slight preference at the time for Budapest, no final choice was made, and the outbreak of World War I soon afterwards prevented any further progress.

In 1915, Lyon made a bid for the 1920 games, but after some discussion, they agreed to support Antwerp and postpone their bid until 1924 if Antwerp was liberated in time to organize the games. The support for Belgium by cousin country France, then the leading country of the IOC, also meant that Amsterdam, and Budapest, in an enemy state, made no chance for the 1920 games against Antwerp. New candidacies from American cities did not have that disadvantage and bids were received from Cleveland, Philadelphia, and Atlanta (which would eventually host the 1996 Summer Olympics), and Cuba also planned a bid for Havana. But shortly after the armistice in November 1918, the IOC decided to give Antwerp the first choice, if they still wanted to host the 1920 Games. In March 1919, the Belgian Olympic Committee decided to go ahead with the organization, and on 5 April 1919, in a meeting in Lausanne, Antwerp was officially declared the host city for the games of the VIIth Olympiad.

Organization
The 1920 Summer Games organizers had very little time to prepare. The time between the IOC's decision of choosing Antwerp as the host city and the start of the Olympic Games was less than two years.

An executive committee was established on 17 April 1919, with Henri de Baillet-Latour as chairman and Alfred Verdyck, the secretary of the Belgian Union of Football Clubs, as general secretary. Seven commissions were created, to deal with finances, accommodation, press relations, propaganda, schedules, transport, and festivities. Finances and scheduling proved to be the two hardest parts to tackle: the program of events only was published in February 1920, six months before the official start of the Games.

Between 23 and 30 April 1920, an ice hockey tournament marked the early start of the Games. Held in the "Palais de Glace" or Ice Palace in Antwerp, it was the first time that ice hockey was an Olympic sport.

The first stone of the new Olympisch Stadion was laid on 4 July 1919 by Jan De Vos, mayor of Antwerp, and inaugurated less than a year later on 23 May 1920 with a gymnastics demonstration.

When the Olympic Games began, the stadium was still unfinished with some events being built over fortifications and others using existing locations. The athletes quarters were crowded and athletes slept on folding cots.

The nautical stadium or Stade Nautique d'Antwerp was built at the end of the Jan Van Rijswijcklaan, using the city ramparts there as a spectator's stand. Other events, like shooting, boxing, and equestrian sports, were held at pre-existing locations in and around Antwerp and as far away as Ostend.

The amount of spectators were low throughout Antwerp's Summer Olympics since not many people could afford tickets. In the closing days of the Olympic Games, students were allowed to attend the event for free. After the conclusion of the Olympic Games, Belgium recorded a loss of more than 600 million francs.

Highlights
 The Olympic Games being a symbol of peace and global solidarity shone at Antwerp. These Olympics were the first in which the Olympic Oath was voiced, the first in which doves were released to symbolize peace, and the first in which the Olympic Flag was flown to display the unity of the world's continents through its 5 rings.
 The United States won 41 gold, 27 silver, and 27 bronze medals. Sweden, Great Britain, Finland, and Belgium rounded out the five most successful medal-winning nations, with France and Belgium being the nations that fielded the most athletes, with the United States being only the third by that statistic.
 The Games also featured a week of winter sports, with figure skating appearing for the first time since the 1908 Olympics, and ice hockey making its Olympic debut.
 Nedo Nadi won 5 gold medals in the fencing events. 
 At the age of 72, Sweden's 100 metre running deer double-shot event champion Oscar Swahn, who had participated in the 1908 and 1912 Games, came in second in the team event to become the oldest Olympic medal winner ever.
 23-year-old Paavo Nurmi won the 10,000 m and 8000 m cross country races, took another gold in team cross country, and a silver in the 5000 m run. His contributions for Finland broke a record in track and field with 9 medals.
 Duke Kahanamoku retained the 100 m swimming title he won before the war.
 In a rather strange moment in Olympic history, the 12-foot dinghy event in sailing took place in two different countries. The final two races in the event were independently held in the Netherlands, on its own accord, supposedly because the only two competitors in the event were Dutch.
Sport shooter Guilherme Paraense won Brazil's very first gold medal at the Olympic Games.
The United States sent a women's swimming team for the first time, and the Americans won seven out of seven available swimming medals.

Sports/Events

156 events in 29 disciplines, comprising 22 sports, were part of the Olympic program in 1920. The Sailing program was open for a total of 16 sailing classes, but actually only 14 sailing events were contested. The number of events in each discipline is noted in parentheses.

Demonstration sport
 Korfball

Venues
Seventeen sports venues were used in the 1920 Summer Olympics. This marked the first time that the football tournament was spread throughout the country, which has mostly been the case since.

Participating nations
 
A total of 29 nations participated in the Antwerp Games, only one more than in 1912, as Germany, Austria, Hungary, Bulgaria and Ottoman Empire were not invited, having lost World War I. From the newly created European states, only Estonia took part, and Czechoslovakia, succeeding Bohemia which had sent athletes prior to World War I as part of the Austrian Empire. Poland and the Soviet Union were busy with the Polish-Soviet War and therefore were unable to form an Olympic team. Argentina, the Kingdom of Serbs, Croats and Slovenes, Brazil, and Monaco competed as nations at the Olympic Games for the first time. New Zealand, which had competed as part of a combined team with Australia in 1908 and 1912, competed on its own for the first time.

 The  had one competitor, Eric Robertson. But as the dominion had no official Olympic committee, his nationality could not be confirmed and he represented Great Britain.

As the local Olympic Organizing Committee went bankrupt during the Antwerp 1920 Games, no official report of the Games was ever produced. The documents of the Games were archived at the Belgium Olympic Committee headquarters in Brussels.

Number of athletes by National Olympic Committees

Medal count

These are the top ten nations that won medals at the 1920 Games. These were the first Olympics where the host nation did not win the most medals overall.

See also

Notes

External links

Openingsceremonie – An article about the opening ceremonies of the 1920 Antwerp Olympiade in Flemish (archived)

 
Summer Olympics by year
Summer Olympics
Summer Olympics
Olympic Games in Belgium
1920s in Antwerp
Sports competitions in Antwerp
August 1920 sports events
September 1920 sports events